Edward W. Helfrick (March 11, 1928 – September 28, 2021) was a Republican member of the Pennsylvania State Senate. He also served in the Pennsylvania House of Representatives from 1977 to 1980.

Helfrick died on September 28, 2021, at the age of 93.

References

External links
 - Official PA Senate Profile

1928 births
2021 deaths
Republican Party Pennsylvania state senators
Republican Party members of the Pennsylvania House of Representatives
People from Pottsville, Pennsylvania